Rēzekne Municipality is a municipality in Latgale, Latvia. The municipality was formed in 2009 by merging Audriņi parish, Bērzgale parish, Čornaja parish, Dricāni parish, Feimaņi parish, Gaigalava parish, Griškāni parish, Ilzeskalns parish, Kantinieki parish, Kaunata parish, Lendži parish, Lūznava parish, Mākoņkalns parish, Malta parish, Nagļi parish, Nautrēni parish, Ozolaine parish, Ozolmuiža parish, Puša parish, Rikava parish, Sakstagals parish, Silmala parish, Stoļerova parish, Strūžāni parish and Vērēmi parish, town Viļāni.  The population in 2020 was 24,127.

2021 reform 
Within the 2021 Latvian administrative reform it was initially planned to merge Varakļāni Municipality into Rēzekne Municipality. After protests from locals, parts of which wanted to preserve the status quo or preferred joining Madona Municipality, the municipal council submitted a case to the Constitutional Court of Latvia in June 2020. On 28 May 2021 the court declared the planned merge is unconstitutional. However, on June 31 the Saeima voted to proceed with the merge, which prompted the involvement of the President of Latvia Egils Levits to avoid triggering a constitutional crisis. Ultimately, a decision was made to postpone the decision on the future of the Varakļāni and Rēzekne municipalities until 2025. Due to this, the 2021 Latvian local elections for the new municipalities were also held in Varakļāni.

Twin towns — sister cities

Rēzekne Municipality is twinned with:

 Aust-Agder, Norway
 Biržai, Lithuania
 Edineț, Moldova
 Gölbaşı, Turkey
 Kupiškis, Lithuania
 Pastavy, Belarus
 Polotsk, Belarus
 Zgierz, Poland

See also
Administrative divisions of Latvia

References

 
Municipalities of Latvia